Yevhen Cherepovsky (17 October 1934 – 12 July 1994) was a Soviet Olympic fencer. He won a bronze medal in the team sabre event at the 1956 Summer Olympics.

References

1934 births
1994 deaths
Ukrainian male sabre fencers
Soviet male sabre fencers
Olympic fencers of the Soviet Union
Fencers at the 1956 Summer Olympics
Fencers at the 1960 Summer Olympics
Olympic bronze medalists for the Soviet Union
Olympic medalists in fencing
Medalists at the 1956 Summer Olympics
Sportspeople from Kharkiv